Vlaardingen Centrum is a metro station in Vlaardingen in the Netherlands. The station is located on the Schiedam–Hoek van Holland railway.

History
Vlaardingen Centrum was first opened as a train station on 17 August 1891.

The Nederlandse Spoorwegen stopped operating the line, including Vlaardingen Centrum railway station, on 1 April 2017 to enable conversion for metro train operations. The station was reopened by RET on 30 September 2019, with preview services operating on 28 September. The station had a yard connected that was used during the early days of the Schiedam-Hoek van Holland railway (Hoekse Lijn). Later the yard got abandoned and removed during the train-metro transition.

Metro services
As of 2019, Vlaardingen Centrum is served by 6 trains per hour on RET Metro Line B, of which 3 per hour travel the full length of the route, and 3 travel only as far as Steendijkpolder

During peak periods, the station is also served by Line A, with 6 trains per hour travelling as far as Vlaardingen West.

Bus services 
Bus services are operated by RET.

References

External links
 Dutch Public Transport journey planner

Rotterdam Metro stations
Railway stations opened in 1891
Railway stations on the Hoekse Lijn
Vlaardingen